Ernest "Imshi" Mason DFC (29 July 1913 – 15 February 1942) was a British World War II flying ace, credited with one Luftwaffe and 14 Regia Aeronautica aircraft destroyed, two shared destroyed, three damaged and another three shared damaged in the air. Mason claimed one and 13 shared destroyed on the ground.

Early life 
Ernest "Imshi" Mason was born in Darlington, and was educated at Blackpool Grammar School. He was a gifted musician (he played the saxophone), and was also interested in engineering and mechanics. He rode motorcycles in dirt track racing at the age of 14. He played in professional dancebands including Archie Andre's (real name Andre Tripello) operating out of Brighton and on tour. He was briefly the co-owner of a Delarge, which he crashed. Foreseeing the coming war, he joined the RAF.

RAF career
Mason joined the RAF in March 1938, being commissioned as an acting pilot officer on 7 Mar 1938 and undergoing training at 4 FTS in Egypt. Mason was confirmed as pilot officer on 7 March 1939. He was initially posted to No. 48 squadron flying Vickers Wellesley bombers, but managed to switch to fighters with No. 80 Squadron flying the Gloster Gladiator by the time the war had started. On 3 September 1940 he was promoted to flying officer. At the end of 1940 he transferred as part of a flight of 80 Squadron forming into 274 Squadron with the Hawker Hurricane.

Mason and Lieutenant Robert Talbot of the SAAF were detached to Sidi Barrani in order to  "freelance" over the Libyan Desert attacking targets of opportunity. It was during this period that Mason developed his preferred style of attack, embarking on long range missions to attack enemy air bases well behind the lines.

By the end of January 1941, Mason's score was 14 kills and he was awarded the DFC in February 1941. By this time, he was also the leading Allied ace in the Middle East theatre.

In March 1941, Mason led a flight to Malta to reinforce the defensive fighter force. On 13 April, Mason attacked four Bf 109s. He was attacked in turn by Oberleutnant Klaus Mietusch of JG 26 and shot down for the German's eighth victory. Mason ditched his aircraft in the sea, suffering wounds to his hand in the combat and a broken nose in the ditching.

By now Mason had assumed a notoriety within the aircrews of the Commonwealth Air Forces, having grown a thick black beard (against RAF regulations) and acquired the nickname "Imshi" ; colloquial Arabic for 'scram', which he reportedly tended to shout at the local pedlars.

During a patrol on 26 January, Mason encountered 3 Fiat G.50bis of 2o Gruppo CT near Derna and 7 Fiat CR.42s of 368a Squadriglia strafing Australian ground positions. Mason shot down two victims, Sottotenente Alfonso Nuti and Maresciallo Guido Papparato from 368a Squadriglia, who were both killed.

In July 1941 Mason assumed command of No. 261 Squadron, reforming in Palestine. In August he led the unit in the occupation of Iran, and in January was posted back to the Western Desert to command No 94 Squadron flying P-40 Kittyhawks.

On 15 February 1942, Mason led a ground attack mission against a Luftwaffe base at Martuba, Egypt. His flight was shot down by Otto Schulz from Jagdgeschwader 27 and he was killed.

Awards
Mason was awarded the Distinguished Flying Cross.  The citation from the London Gazette on 11 February 1941 reads:

"Flying Officer Ernest Mitchelson Mason (40734), No. 274 Squadron.
In January, 1941, this officer destroyed three of a formation of nine enemy aircraft. He has continually shown a fine fighting spirit and has contributed materially to the heavy losses caused to enemy aircraft. He has shown outstanding courage and initiative and has destroyed at least thirteen hostile aircraft".

References

Citations

Bibliography

 Holmes, Tony. Hurricane Aces 1939 - 1940. Osprey Publishing. London. 1998. 
 C. Shores & C. Williams.  Aces High. Grub street. London. 1994. 
 
 
 
 
 

Royal Air Force squadron leaders
British World War II flying aces
Royal Air Force personnel killed in World War II
Companions of the Distinguished Service Order
1942 deaths
Recipients of the Distinguished Flying Cross (United Kingdom)
1913 births
Aviators killed by being shot down
People from Darlington